The Canton of Moissac-1 was one of the 12 cantons of the arrondissement of Castelsarrasin, in the Tarn-et-Garonne department, in southern France. It had 8,392 inhabitants (2012). It was disbanded following the French canton reorganisation which came into effect in March 2015. It comprised 5 communes:
Boudou
Malause
Moissac (partly)
Saint-Paul-d'Espis
Saint-Vincent-Lespinasse

References

Moissac-1
2015 disestablishments in France
States and territories disestablished in 2015